Potu Leavasa Jr. (Motoʻotua,  10 October 1996) is a Samoan rugby union player.
His usual position is as a Flanker or Lock and he currently plays for Manawatu Turbos in NPC.

In 2020 Mitre 10 Cup season, he played for Counties Manukau Steelers.
He played for Italian team  for Zebre from 2021 to 2022.

In 2018 and 2019, Leavasa was named in the Samoa A squad.

References

External links
It's Rugby England Profile

Living people
Samoan rugby union players
1996 births
Rugby union locks
Rugby union flankers
Austin Gilgronis players
Counties Manukau rugby union players
Zebre Parma players
Manawatu rugby union players
Moana Pasifika players